The Holy Trinity Church in Kimball, South Dakota has also been known as the Church of the Blessed Trinity and as Bendon Church.  It was built in the former town of Bendon, South Dakota in 1895 and was added to the National Register of Historic Places in 1983.

The church was moved to Kimball after the Brule County Historical Society purchased the church to save it from being dismantled for its lumber.

It was deemed "an important example of Bohemian vernacular religious architecture in South Dakota as well as a visual survivor of Czech settlement history and the town of Bendon."

References

Churches in South Dakota
Churches on the National Register of Historic Places in South Dakota
Roman Catholic churches completed in 1895
Churches in Brule County, South Dakota
Former Roman Catholic church buildings in South Dakota
National Register of Historic Places in Brule County, South Dakota
19th-century Roman Catholic church buildings in the United States